Darensbourg is a surname. Notable people with the surname include:

Donald J. Darensbourg (born 1941), American chemist
Joe Darensbourg (1906–1985), American clarinetist and saxophonist
Marcetta Y. Darensbourg, American chemist
Vic Darensbourg (born 1970), American baseball pitcher